The 1984 Bristol Open was a men's tennis tournament played on outdoor grass courts that was part of the 1984 Volvo Grand Prix. It was played at Bristol in Great Britain from 18 to 25 June 1984. It was the fifth edition of the tournament and the singles title was won by first-seeded Johan Kriek.

Finals

Singles

 Johan Kriek defeated  Brian Teacher 6–7, 7–6, 6–4
 It was Kriek's 1st title of the year and the 16th of his career.

Doubles

 Larry Stefanki /  Robert Van't Hof defeated  John Alexander /  John Fitzgerald 6–4, 5–7, 9–7
 It was Stefanki's only title of the year and the 3rd of his career. It was Van't Hof's only title of the year and the 3rd of his career.

References

External links
 ITF tournament edition details

Bristol Open
 
Bristol Open
Bristol Open
Bristol Open